The Kaili Formation(凯里組) is a stratigraphic formation which was deposited during the Lower and Middle Cambrian (~513 to 506 million years ago).

The depositional environment of the Kaili Formation is not entirely known, and there are two hypotheses for its formation. It may have been a nearshore marine environment with 'normal' levels of oxygenation; or it may have been a deeper water environment further from the shore, on the open continental shelf; in this setting oxygen would not be available below the surface layers of the deposited sediment. The trace fossil assemblages in the formation suggest that it was below the wave base and was reasonably well-oxygenated.

Fossils 
The faunal assemblage is highly diverse, comprising some 110 genera among 11 phyla; of these, some 40 genera are also found in the Burgess Shale, and some 30 are also found in the Maotianshan Shale. Trilobites and eocrinoids with hard parts that are easily preserved are the most common fossils, but many animals with only soft tissues are also preserved. For example, an arthropod similar to the Ediacaran Parvancorina of the Neoproterozoic age Ediacara Hills of South Australia has been found at the Kaili site.

The middle part of the Kaili Formation, the Oryctocephalus indicus Zone, contains a Burgess Shale-type Lagerstätte with many well-preserved fossils known collectively as the Kaili Biota. In terms of age, this biota is located between the two most important and famous Cambrian Lagerstätten: the middle Lower Cambrian Maotianshan Shale (containing the Chengjiang Biota), also from China: and the Middle Cambrian Burgess Shale, known from Canada.

Some other notable fossils discovered at Kaili are putative invertebrate eggs and embryos, trace fossils of the genus Gordia (not to be confused with the Gordian worms), as well as Naraoia, chancellorids, Microdictyon, Wiwaxia, and Marrella.

The Kaili Formation is subdivided into three trilobite zones:
 Bathynotus holopygous–Ovatoryctocara granulata Zone
 Oryctocephalus indicus Zone
 Olenoides jialaoensis Zone

Candidate for GSSP 
An outcrop of the Kaili Formation, the Wuliu-Zengjiayan section, is a candidate for the GSSP for the beginning of the 5th stage of the Cambrian. The FAD of two trilobites from the formation are proposed to be the official stage boundary, Oryctocephalus indicus and Ovatoryctocara granulata. Both can be correlated with formations of similar age in Siberia and China.

References 

Geologic formations of China
Cambrian System of Asia
Cambrian China
Shale formations
Mudstone formations
Open marine deposits
Cambrian northern paleotemperate deposits
Lagerstätten
Fossiliferous stratigraphic units of Asia
Paleontology in Guizhou